Osteolaeminae is a subfamily of true crocodiles within the family Crocodylidae containing the dwarf crocodiles and slender-snouted crocodiles, and is the sister taxon to Crocodylinae.

Taxonomy
Osteolaeminae was named by Christopher Brochu in 2003 as a subfamily of Crocodylidae separate from Crocodylinae, and is cladistically defined as Osteolaemus tetraspis (the Dwarf crocodile) and all crocodylians more closely related to it than to Crocodylus niloticus (the Nile crocodile). This is a stem-based definition, and is the sister taxon to Crocodylinae. Osteolaeminae contains the two extant genera Osteolaemus and Mecistops, along with several extinct genera, although the number of extant species within Osteolaeminae is currently in question.

Phylogeny
The cladogram below is based on two studies that combined morphological, molecular (DNA sequencing), and stratigraphic (fossil age) data.

Alternatively, other morphological studies have recovered Mecistops as a basal member of Crocodylinae, more closely related to Crocodylus than to Osteolaemus and the other members of Osteolaeminae, as shown in the cladogram below.

Species list
 Subfamily Osteolaeminae
 Genus Osteolaemus
 Osteolaemus osborni, Osborn’s dwarf crocodile
 Osteolaemus tetraspis, dwarf crocodile (There has been controversy as to whether or not this is actually two species; recent (2010) DNA analysis indicate three distinct species: O. tetraspis, O. osborni and a third, currently unnamed.)
 Genus Mecistops
Mecistops cataphractus, West African slender-snouted crocodile
 Mecistops leptorhynchus, Central African slender-snouted crocodile
 Genus Brochuchus
 Brochuchus pigotti (formerly Crocodylus pigotti)
 Brochuchus parvidens
 Genus Euthecodon
 Euthecodon nitriae
 Euthecodon brumpti
 Euthecodon arambourgi
 Genus Rimasuchus
 Rimasuchus lloydi (formerly Crocodylus lloydi)

References

Crocodylidae
Reptile subfamilies